The Operation Zalzala (English: Operation Earthquake), was a Pakistan Army military offensive manhunt and a counter-insurgent operation that was commenced on 18 January 2008. The operation concluded with mixed results as the army had successfully captured the area, but had failed to capture or kill Qari Hussain, the main objective of the operation.

Location

Spinkai is a small town in South Waziristan, and at the time of Operation Zalzala it was part of the Federally Administered Tribal Areas, an autonomous area of Pakistan. The town is mostly inhabited by the Pashtun tribe Mahsud. Since 2004, South Waziristan had been a major control and command area of Taliban and Al-Qaida forces until it was cleared by Pakistan Defence Forces in 2009 in the Operation Rah-e-Nijat.

Firefight

On 15 and 16 January 2008, large number of pro-Taliban militants had overrun Ludha, which resulted in Taliban victory as they had killed several paramilitary soldiers. On 24 January, the Pakistan Army started a full-fledged operation called 'Zalzala' (earthquake). The operation was led by Pakistan Army's 14th Infantry Division (normally stationed in Okara and assigned to II Corps) as it was supported by 20th Mountaineering Brigade. Major-General Tariq Khan, General Officer Commanding (GOC) of 14th Infantry Division served the Operation's Officer Commanding.

On 20 January 2008, the operation was launched. The army swept the area through with AH-1 Cobra helicopters, artillery and Al-Zarrar and Al-Khalid tanks that crunched across a parched riverbed. The troops were later inserted in the area and the manhunt operation was later introduced. During the operation, the army aimed to kill Qari Hussain, the chief Taliban chief ideologist who was considered an expert in preparing suicide attacks. After four days of heavy fighting, more than 25 militants and six soldiers died. However, the army was unable to kill or captured Qari Hussain. After months of heavy fighting, an unknown number of Taliban militants were killed, and they had abandoned their positions. Within a first week of February, the army had captured the entire town and the army was in full control of it. The militants were later retreated up the valley. The militants had again launched their attacks on the troops but they were unable to re-gain the control of the town as they had suffered major human casualties.

On 18 May 2008, during the media briefing, the army at Spainkai Raghzai had announced that they had intercepted militants’ wireless communication saying that Qari Hussain had been killed in the several weeks long operation launched on 24 January. However, on 26 May, it was later revealed that Qari Hussain had survived the operation, and Pakistan Army was unable to find or kill Qari Hussain during the operation.

Aftermath

More than 200,000 people were displaced after the announcement of operation. During the operation, the army troops had discovered bomb factories and schools for teenage suicide bombers. Hate Literature and CDs were also confiscated by the army. The Army later on took part in the rebuilding process and helped facilitate the return of villagers to their respective homes.

The sporadic fighting continued in the area, and the troops were still fighting the Taliban forces. Following the operation, the Tehrik-i-Taliban Pakistan (TTP) offered a truce and peace negotiations resulting in a suspension of violence. In spite of the victory in the operation, on 21 May 2008 Pakistan signed a peace agreement with the Tehrik-i-Taliban Pakistan (TTP).

See Also 

 Operation Sherdil
 Operation Black Thunderstorm

References

2008 in Pakistan
Bajaur
Conflicts in 2008
History of Khyber Pakhtunkhwa
Wars involving the Taliban